Milk parsley is a common name for several plants and may refer to:

Ligusticopsis wallichiana (syn. Selinum wallichianum), native to the Himalayas and cultivated as a garden plant
Peucedanum palustre, native throughout Europe and Central Asia and with a broad distribution in the British Isles. Formerly; Selinum palustre.
Peucedanum verticillare, a herbaceous plant in the genus Peucedanum of the family Apiaceae, found in SE Europe and Asia
Selinum carvifolia, or Cambridge milk parsley, native in much of Europe, with a restricted distribution in the British Isles